Cooping was a form of electoral fraud in the United States, often cited in relation to the death of Edgar Allan Poe in October 1849,  by which citizens were kidnapped off the street and forced to vote, often several times over, for an election candidate. According to several of Poe's biographers, so-called 'cooping gangs' or 'election gangs' working for a political candidate would hold random victims in a room (the "coop") and ply them with alcohol or give them face beatings to get them to comply. Often their clothing would be changed to fool voting officials and vote multiple times, or they would be given disguises such as wigs, fake beards, or mustaches.

Other 19th-century accounts do not relate to voter fraud but instead, describe press gangs that used cooping to pressure recruits for the Union Army during the American Civil War. One claim of cooping enlistees was made in a letter from Brigadier General Edward Winslow Hincks read by the Clerk of the House of Representatives in 1865. The general, who was in charge of the enlistment in New York, blamed the poor quality of enlisted men on cooping, whereby the men were "cooped up", plied with a drink to the point of stupefaction, and tricked into enlisting.

See also
 Ballot stuffing
 Shanghaiing

References 

 Political history of the United States
 Edgar Allan Poe
 Voting in the United States
 Electoral fraud in the United States